The municipality of Corinth is a Greek municipality located in the Peleponnese region established on 1 January 2011 under the Kallikratis Plan for local government reform. The municipality is made up of five previous municipalities: Assos-Lechaio, Corinth, Saronikos, Tenea and Solygeia. The area of the new municipality is 611.29 square kilometers and it has a population of 58,192, based on the 2011 census. The seat of the municipality is Corinth and its symbol is the Pegasus.

Sources

Municipalities of Peloponnese (region)
Populated places in Corinthia